St. Bernard's School of Theology and Ministry is a private Catholic graduate school in Rochester, New York.  It has existed in its current form since 2003 but has existed in previous forms since 1893.

History
St. Bernard's original institution was Saint Bernard's Seminary, founded in 1893 in Rochester. Standing for 98 years in its original location on the north side of Rochester, it also educated men and women for lay ministry, and was one of the first U.S. seminaries to accept laity.  Its campus still exists and is on the National Register of Historic Places.

On 25 September 1981, Saint Bernard's Seminary was granted by the New York State Education Department an amendment to its charter, changing its corporate name to St. Bernard's Institute.  The campus was relocated to that of Colgate Rochester Divinity School, sharing the buildings, including the library, and cross-registering students for classes that fit both schools' curricula.  The institute also opened an extension in the Roman Catholic Diocese of Albany in autumn 1989.

In 2003, St. Bernard's assumed its current name and moved to its own facility on French Road in Rochester, New York. It has been there ever since and offers four graduate degrees in theology, pastoral studies, divinity, and Catholic philosophy - all of which can be taken online. 

It is the official repository for the writings and papers of the noted evangelist and author, Archbishop Fulton J. Sheen, who was Bishop of Rochester.

See also
 Saint Bernard's Seminary

References

External links

Education in Rochester, New York
Educational institutions established in 1893
Catholic seminaries in the United States
Seminaries and theological colleges in New York (state)
Universities and colleges in Monroe County, New York
1893 establishments in New York (state)